The Cojines del Zaque (English: "Cushions of the Zaque") is an archeological site of the Muisca located in the city of Tunja, Boyacá, which in the time of the Muisca Confederation was called Hunza. The cojines are two round stones used in the religion of the Muisca to worship Sun god Sué and his wife; Moon goddess Chía. When the Spanish conquistadores arrived, they called them Cojines del Diablo.

Background 
During the time before the Spanish conquest of the Muisca, the central highlands of the Colombian Andes (Altiplano Cundiboyacense) were populated by the Muisca. This advanced civilization had its own religion and rituals, centered around the most important deities Sué and Chía. The northern territories were ruled by the iraca of Sugamuxi, the tundama of Tundama and the zaque based in Hunza.

Description 
The Cojines are two circular stones made of sandstone located at the base of the San Lázaro hill in Tunja. The northernmost Cojín measures  in diameter and the southern pillow . The stones are oriented with respect to the solar elliptic and consist of an inclined part in the west and a flat part in the east. The rocks were used by the zaque to kneel down and pray to Sué at sunrise.

The Cojines were studied as of 1847 and in 1928 the city of Tunja made the stones into an archeological site.

Rituals and festivities 
Every morning the zaque would go in a procession from his grand bohío in Hunza to the Cojines. Apart from the daily rituals, also with sowing and harvests, rituals were performed on the Cojines del Zaque.

The Muisca calendar defined the months of sowing and harvests and those periods would fall on the Gregorian calendar in the months of March and September respectively. To increase the fertility of the lands the Muisca had their agriculture, they performed festivities to the gods around the Cojines del Zaque. During these festivals, the Muisca danced in groups, holding hands and sang to the music of flutes, ocarinas and other instruments. They danced on the rhythm of drums. During these rituals the Muisca got drunk by drinking their typical chicha.

Sometimes twelve year-old boys; moxas, captured from other indigenous peoples in the region would be sacrificed to the gods at the site of the Cojines del Zaque. The heads of the boys would be placed on the cojines and the children decapitated draining the Cojines in blood. The Muisca left their bodies lying there as food for Sué. The bodies would be retrieved after a few days.

See also 
 Sun Temple (Sogamoso)
 Muisca religion, mythology
 Piedras del Tunjo
 Pacanchique

References 

Muisca mythology and religion
Muisca and pre-Muisca sites
Rock art in South America
Pre-Columbian archaeological sites
Archaeological sites in Colombia
Buildings and structures in Boyacá Department
Tourist attractions in Boyacá Department
Buildings and structures in Tunja
Muysccubun